Tina Trebec (born March 10, 1990) is a Slovenian basketball player for Sassari Sardegna and the Slovenian national team.

She participated at the EuroBasket Women 2017, 2019, 2021.

References

1990 births
Living people
Slovenian women's basketball players
People from Postojna
Power forwards (basketball)
Slovenian expatriate basketball people in Bulgaria